José Adolfo Mendoza Zambrano (born 24 July 1982) is a Peruvian football player currently playing for Santa Rosa PNP.

Club career 
Mendoza has played for multiple clubs in Peru as well as Greece. He started at América Cochahuayco in 2002 and was later promoted to Universitario, playing for them until 2006. Subsequently, he played for Sporting Cristal in 2007 before moving to Greece to play for Veria F.C. and Ethnikos Asteras F.C. He returned to Peru to play with newly promoted Juan Aurich in 2008. He then signed with Inti Gas Deportes—another newly promoted team—and played for 2 years in Ayacucho. In 2011, he returned to his original club Universitario.

International career 
Mendoza debuted with the national football team against Japan for the 2005 Kirin Cup on May 22, 2005.

References

External links 

1982 births
Living people
People from Pisco, Peru
Association football midfielders
Association football fullbacks
Association football utility players
Peruvian footballers
Peru international footballers
U América F.C. footballers
Club Universitario de Deportes footballers
Sporting Cristal footballers
Veria F.C. players
Ethnikos Asteras F.C. players
Juan Aurich footballers
Ayacucho FC footballers
Sport Huancayo footballers
Universidad Técnica de Cajamarca footballers
Sport Victoria players
Alianza Atlético footballers
Comerciantes Unidos footballers
Peruvian Primera División players
Peruvian Segunda División players
Peruvian expatriate footballers
Expatriate footballers in Greece
Peruvian expatriate sportspeople in Greece